The Federal Junior Duck Stamp is an American art competition sponsored by the United States government for students to draw, or paint a duck realistically. The national winner's design is used to create a (non-postal) stamp which is sold to raise funds for environmental education.

Background
The program began in 1989 with a grant from the National Fish and Wildlife Foundation (NFWF) and was first recognized by the United States Congress in 1994 when the Junior Duck Stamp Conservation and Design Program Act was enacted.

Entries in the contest may be paintings or drawings. The program is designed to be "a dynamic arts curriculum that teaches wetlands and waterfowl conservation to students from kindergarten through high school". The best of show winner from each state participates in a national tour of entries and is forwarded to the national competition.

There is also a Conservation Message contest, where contestants write their own conservation messages about wildlife.

Each year, Junior Duck Stamp State Coordinators in all 50 U.S. states, American Samoa and the U.S. Virgin Islands help to bring the Junior Duck Stamp Conservation and Design Program to more than 28,000 students.  To honor the most dedicated coordinators, the Junior Duck Stamp Program developed the Green Ribbon Award for State Coordinator of the Year.  We are pleased to recognize the 2011 State Coordinator of the Year, Marilyn Gamette of California.  Gamette has been committed to the JDS program since its inception in 1989, working to expand the program in California and helping to break state and national records with 3,126 pieces of art submitted in 2011.  Throughout her career and into her retirement from the Sacramento National Wildlife Refuge Complex, Gamette has inspired children and adults with her dedication and educational efforts.

There was controversy in 2013 when the competition's youngest ever national winner, six-year-old Madison Grimm, was stripped of her win because of accusations of plagiarism. A few days later she was reinstated as the winner, after the US Fish & Wildlife Service decided the competition had been fair, despite Madison using a tracing technique. Her design was used for the $5 stamp and she received a $5,000 scholarship.

References

External links
 Official website

American visual arts awards
Wildlife artists
Visual arts competitions